Donald Reid (1850 – 3 September 1922) was a solicitor, farmer and politician who lived in Milton, Otago New Zealand.

Otago
Donald Reid was born, probably in Dunedin where he was baptised, the eldest son of the 15 children of Scottish parents, Charles Reid (1828–1897), founder of Standard Insurance and his wife Charlotte Thyne Young (1830–1904). Charles was a brother of Donald Reid, founder of the Dunedin stock and station agency Donald Reid & Co.

Educated at Otago Boys' High School he married in 1885 Alicia Charlotte (1862–1933), the eldest daughter of  F C Fulton then of Napier formerly of Caversham. She was a cousin of Harry Fulton.

Politics

Mayor of Milton

Admitted a solicitor in 1873 he went to Milton in 1874 and was elected mayor of Milton the first time in 1879 and returned for a second term at the next election. He served again in 1894, 1895 1896 1897 to 1898 then for a third period from 1906 to 1908. A grand total of 8 terms.

Parliament
He represented the Bruce electorate from an August  by-election, following the resignation of Robert Gillies, to December 1887 when he was defeated in that election by J C Anderson.

Decease
Donald Reid died at Milton 3 September 1922. He was survived by his widow and three sons: Frank a Dunedin motor vehicle importer and distributor, Donald a Milton farmer and Gordon a Hamilton architect.

References

1850 births
1922 deaths
Members of the New Zealand House of Representatives
Unsuccessful candidates in the 1887 New Zealand general election
New Zealand MPs for South Island electorates
19th-century New Zealand politicians
Mayors of places in Otago
People from Milton, New Zealand